Kazimieras Saja (born 27 June 1932) is a Lithuanian writer and politician.  In 1990 he was among those who signed the Act of the Re-Establishment of the State of Lithuania.

Awards
1998: Knigh's Cross of the Order of the Lithuanian Grand Duke Gediminas
2022:  Lithuanian National Prize for Culture and Arts.

References

1932 births
Living people
Lithuanian politicians
Lithuanian writers
Lithuanian University of Educational Sciences alumni